Gullvåg is a surname. Notable people with the surname include:

Eigil Gullvåg (1921–1991), Norwegian newspaper editor and politician
Håkon Gullvåg (born 1959), Norwegian painter
Olav Gullvåg (1885–1961), Norwegian playwright, novelist, poet, and editor
Steinar Gullvåg (born 1946), Norwegian politician